Dactyliosolen is a genus of diatoms belonging to the family Rhizosoleniaceae.

Species:

Dactyliosolen alternans 
Dactyliosolen antarcticus 
Dactyliosolen areolatus

References

Diatoms
Diatom genera